Richard Reeve Baxter (14 February 1921 – 25 September 1980) was a widely published American jurist  and from 1950 until his death the preeminent figure on the law of war.  Baxter served as a judge on the International Court of Justice (1979–1980), as a professor of law at Harvard University (1954 - 1979) and as an enlisted man and officer in the U.S. Army (1942–46,1948–54). He is noted for consistently favoring  moves that enhanced the protections afforded to those injured or threatened by armed conflict. Baxter authored the 1956 revision of the  U.S. Army Manual on the Law of Land Warfare  (FM27-10 ) and was  a leading representative of the U.S. at the Geneva conferences that concluded the Protocols to the Geneva Conventions on the Laws of War. Baxter also, at the time of his death, was the preeminent scholar on the law of international waterways. He died of cancer one year into his term as a judge of the International Court of Justice.

Early life & academic career

Richard Reeve Baxter was born in New York city and graduated from Brown University in 1942.  After university, Baxter joined the U.S. Army and served as an enlisted man until the end of World War II.  He then entered the Harvard School of Law and rejoined the U.S. Army after graduating from the law school in 1948. In 1950 the army sent Baxter (then Captain) to work for a year with Professor Sir Hersch Lauterpacht, the Whewell Professor of International Law at Cambridge University and, at the time, the world's leading international legal scholar. Lauterpacht became a patron of Baxter's and was instrumental in Baxter leaving the Army in 1954 for a teaching position at Harvard Law School.  At the time of his resignation from the U.S. Army, Baxter was awarded the Legion of Merit and held the position of Chief of the International Law Branch – Office of the Judge Advocate General. Baxter was later appointed as a full professor of law and first holder of the Manley O Hudson Chair of International Law. Baxter's research at Harvard concerned the legal regime of inter oceanic canals with an emphasis on the Panama and Suez. He became the leading scholar in the area of law concerning international waterways and his advice was actively sought by the Pentagon and State Department during the Suez crisis.  Baxter's research was published as the monograph, The Law of International Waterways   and is considered the definitive work on the subject and a classic in its field. In the latter part of his twenty years of teaching at Harvard Law School, he devoted a great deal of time and effort to the writing, together with Professor Louis B. Sohn, of a study on State responsibility for the U.N. International Law Commission.

International Court of Justice
In 1978 U.S. President Jimmy Carter informed the U.S. National Group at the Permanent Court of Arbitration that he desired former Supreme Court Justice Arthur Goldberg selected as the nominee to the International Court of Justice. However, Baxter's nomination for the 1978 election to the ICJ was universally supported in the international law community and, as a result, the US national group at the Permanent Court of Arbitration did not honor President Carter's request. The group nominated Baxter and he was subsequently elected to the Court by the U.N. General Assembly and U.N. Security Council.   Before falling terminally ill, Baxter was able to take part in the case,  The U.S. Diplomatic and Consular Staff in Tehran.   Several of Baxter's fellow judges commented on his well reasoned and objective analysis during deliberations of the case.

International Court of Justice ruling

Baxter and the law of war

Contribution to Rules of Land Warfare

Baxter participated in a British–United States conference in 1953 focusing on the amendment of both the British Manual of Military Law and the United States'Rules of Land Warfare. Amendments needed to the British and American manuals were made necessary by the adoption of the Geneva Conventions of 1949 and the great development in the jurisprudence of the law of war which took place as a result of World War II and Korean war.  In 1956, Baxter authored the complete revision to the Rules of Land Warfare. The 1956 version guided many American military officers over the years and remains the basic text.

Impact of weapons on non-combatants

A large part of Baxter's work addressed the need to protect non-combatant civilians from death and injury during conflicts.  As a result, Baxter took a strong interest in old and new weaponry and in the ways weapons could be controlled in order to minimize injury to non-combatants.  He wrote about nuclear warfare and addressed the use of poison gas during World War I.
 He also wrote extensively about the 1925 Geneva Convention that outlawed the use of gas in armed conflict and stridently urged congress to ratify the Geneva Protocol on Chemical and Biological Warfare. Baxter's writings also addressed the devastation of civilian homelands during World War II, in particular, through area bombing.

Protocols to Geneva Conventions

Baxter's writings on the impact of aerial bombings on non-combatants was an impetus for the U.N. General Assembly to add additional humanitarian conventions needed to protect civilians from death and injury during armed conflicts. In 1969 Baxter represented the U.S. at the conference of government experts held prior to the convening of the Geneva diplomatic conferences. Assisting Baxter was Waldemar A. Solf, chief of the international affairs division at the Office of the Judge Advocate General of the Army and the person who became Baxter's functional successor as the Department of the Army's doctrinal authority on the laws of war.  These meetings resulted in two draft Protocols to the Geneva Conventions of 1949:

 Draft of Protocol 1 – Additional Protocol to the Geneva Conventions of Aug. 12, 1949 Relating to the Protection of Victims of International Armed Conflicts
 Draft of Protocol 2 – Additional Protocol to the Geneva Conventions of Aug. 12, 1949 and Relating to the Protection of Victims of Non International Armed Conflicts.
The Geneva Diplomatic Conferences met in four sessions between 1974 and 1977. Along with the U.S. State Dept. Legal Adviser and seven senior staff officers from the Department of Defense, Baxter participated actively in the negotiations. Although the United States did not ratify the Protocols, it has regarded important portions of them as representing customary international law binding on all nations.  As a result, Air Force operations during the Gulf and Iraq Wars were carefully planned and monitored to minimize civilian losses.

Contribution to the American Society of International Law

As a member of the American Society of International Law and later as president, Baxter had a significant impact on the propagation of interest in the field of international law.  It was Baxter's suggestion to organize a student branch of the society which led to the creation of the Association of Student International Law Societies and a proliferation of student interest in international law, which was manifested in scores of new law journals and societies in law schools throughout the United States. It was also Baxter's idea for the Society to sponsor the international moot court competition which he recommended be named in honor of Philip Jessup The Phillip Jessup Moot Court Competition has grown considerably since its inception and involves students from law schools worldwide. Baxter was also one of the founders of the publication  International Legal Materials  that has been published every month since 1962 and provides a source of important treaties, judicial and arbitral decisions, national legislation, international organizations resolutions and other documents for scholar, practitioners, business and government officials.

Tributes
 He was that rare teacher whose former students became lifelong friends and colleagues and who cared deeply about them and their professional development long after they ceased to be, formally at least, his students. – Thomas Buergenthal
 I am persuaded that the essential qualities were all apparent from what I saw on our first encounter in 1953. Competence and intelligence, informed by thorough scholarship; devotion to the cause of international law; a strong element of common sense and practicality in seeking to promote international law; a strong moral force; prodigious capacity for hard work, creative work as well as what he called donkey work, wit and humor in observing the human scene; compassion, tact, and kindness in dealing with other laborers in the same field; and, finally, a talent for friendship. All these qualities were integrated in Dick (Richard) Baxter in harmonious combination. – Monroe Leigh
 He worked like a jovial demon. His comments on prospective manuscripts were detailed and constructive, or dispositive, as the manuscript merited. Many an author might have listed him as co author, so extensive and excellent were his suggestions. The meetings of the board of editors of the Journal,(The American Journal of International Law) under his cheery chairmanship, were a delight. He would annually distribute, among other items, a list of articles he had not deemed worthy of submission to other editors for analysis but had rejected on his own authority; he disposed of a hundred or more each year, in addition to all of his other work. Each entry was accompanied by a pithy dispositive comment worthy of The New Yorker magazine. This list was destroyed at the meeting to avoid embarrassing those whose submissions had been rejected-an act typical of the consideration for the feelings of others with which Baxter acted. – Stephen Schwebel
 He was just the right person to be an international judge: he knew the law; he understood people; he was endowed with balance and restraint; his writing could make the absorption of complex and even dull material simple and pleasurable. – Elihu Lauterpacht
 His extraordinary facility for listening sympathetically to everyone's point of view and of incorporating these in imaginative draft proposals was widely admired and respected. More important, perhaps, was his remarkable ingenuity in then reducing these often conflicting texts to one or two. We participants, and indeed the law itself, benefited enormously from his presence. - David M. Miller

Ribbon bar

Selected works
 The Law of War,  "The Present State of International law and Other Essays: Written in Honour of the Centenary Celebration of the International Law Association 1873- 1973", pp. 107–124.
 The Duty of Obedience to the Belligerent Occupant, "The British Year Book of International Law", Vol.27, 190, pp. 235–266.
 So-Called 'Unprivileged Belligerency': Spies, Guerrillas, and Saboteurs, "The British Year Book of International Law", Vol. 28, 1951, pp. 323–345.
 The Municipal and International Law Basis of Jurisdiction Over War Crimes, "The British Yearbook of International Law", Vol. 28, 1951, pp. 382–393.
 Constitutional Forms and Some Legal Problems of International Military Command, "The British Year book of International Law", Vol. 29, 1952, pp. 325–359.
 The Geneva Conventions of 1949, "Naval War College Review", Vol. VIII NO.5, January 1956, pp. 59–82.
 The First Modern Codification of the Law of War: Francis Lieber and General Order No. 100, "International Review of the Red Cross", Vol.3, No. 26, May 1963, pp. 234–250.
 Legal Aspects of the Geneva Protocol of 1925 (with Thomas Buergenthal), "The American Journal of International Law", Vol. 64, 1970, pp. 853–879.
 The Law of War in the Arab-Israeli Conflict: On Water and on Land, "Towson State Journal of International Affairs", Vol. VI, No.1, Fall 1971, pp. 1–15.
 A Skeptical Look at the Concept of Terrorism, "Akron Law Review", Vol. VI, No.1, Fall 1971, pp. 1–15.
 Perspective – The Evolving Laws of armed Conflicts, "Military Law Review", Vol. 60, 1973, pp. 99–111. Department of the Army Pamphlet 27-100-60, p. 99
 Ius in Bello Interno:' The Present and Future Law, "Law & Civil War in the Modern World", Edited by John Norton Moore, Baltimore: The Johns Hopkins University Press, 1974, pp. 518–536.
 The Geneva Conventions of 1949 and Wars of National Liberation, "International Terrorism and Political Crimes", Edited by: M. Cherif Bassiouni, New York: Thomas Publishing, 1975, pp. 120–132.
 Humanitarian Law or Humanitarian Politics? The 1974 Diplomatic Conference on Humanitarian Law, "Harvard International Law Journal", Vol. 16, 1975, pp. 1–26.
 Armistices and Other Forms of Suspension of Hostilities, "Collected Courses of Hague Academy of International Law", Vol. 149, 1976, pp. 355–398.
 Human Rights in War, "Bulletin of the American Academy of Arts and Sciences, Vol. 31, No. 2 (Nov., 1977), pp. 4-13.
 Modernizing the Law of War, "Military Law Review" Vol. 78, 1977, pp. 165–183
 Legal Aspects of Arms Control Measures Concerning the Missile Carrying Submarines and Anti-Submarine Warfare, "The Future of the Sea-Based Deterrent", Cambridge, MA: The MIT Press, 1974, pp. 213–232.
 Forces for Compliance with the Law of War, "Proceedings of the American Society of International Law at Its Annual Meeting (1921-1969), Vol. 58, "Causing compliance with International Law", April 23–25, 1964, pp. 82–99.

Positions
 1952–1954, Chief of International Law Branch, U.S. Army Judge Advocate General
 1953–1980, Lecturer Naval War College
 1954–1979, Professor of Law – Harvard Law School
 1966–1967, Professor of Law – Cambridge University (visiting)
 1970–1978, Editor in Chief – American Journal of Law
 1971–1972, Counselor of Intl. Law, U.S. Department of State
 1974–1976, President of American Society of International Law
 1979–1980, Judge, International Court of Justice

Associations
 Indian Society of International Law (honorary)
 Permanent Court of Arbitration, U.S. National Group
 Council on Foreign Relations
 American Academy of Arts & Sciences
 Massachusetts Bar

Awards
 Manley O Hudson Medal
 Guggenheim Fellow, 1966

External links
 International Court of Justice
 Permanent Court of Arbitration
 Richard Reeve Baxter - German
 Richard Reeve Baxter - Dutch
 Richard Reeve Baxter - Francais

References

1921 births
1980 deaths
Brown University alumni
Harvard Law School alumni
International Court of Justice judges
American jurists
20th-century American judges
American judges of United Nations courts and tribunals
American Journal of International Law editors
United States Army personnel of World War II
Presidents of the American Society of International Law